Triscaedecia is a genus of moths in the family Alucitidae, found in the Malay and Polynesian regions. Triscaedecia is distinguished from all other genera in the family by the hindwings being split into seven, instead of six, lobes. The lobes in both wings are only split to about two-thirds of the length of the wings. The genus was erected by George Hampson in 1905.

Species

Triscaedecia dactyloptera Hampson, 1905
Triscaedecia sarawaki Ustjuzhanin, Kovtunovich & Hobern, 2019
Triscaedecia septemdactyla (Pagenstecher, 1900)
Triscaedecia sulawesi Ustjuzhanin, Kovtunovich & Hobern, 2019
Triscaedecia suva Ustjuzhanin, Kovtunovich & Hobern, 2019
Triscaedecia svetlanae Ustjuzhanin, Kovtunovich & Hobern, 2019

References 

Alucitidae
Ditrysia genera